Synthetic Division is the debut album by Crossbreed.  The album had three singles:  "Underlined", "Seasons", and "Breathe".

Production
The band recorded the album in New York, after Kittie passed along Crossbreed's demo tape to Artemis Records.

Critical reception
The Washington Post called the album a "no-nonsense debut", writing that "it will get the system pulsing".

Track listing

Notes
"Pure Energy" was written on Christmas Day 2000 when the band was in New York City recording the album and they were unable to spend the day with family.
"Seasons," "Regretful Times," and "Lost Soul" are reworked versions of songs that previously appeared on the band's self-released album .01.
One track cut from the album was a 7 and a half minute instrumental called "Synthetic Division."

References

2001 debut albums
Crossbreed (band) albums
Artemis Records albums